The Chairman of Yaroslav Oblast Duma is the presiding officer of the Yaroslavl Oblast Duma.

Office-holders 
Valentin Melekhin 1994 - 1995
Vladimir Komov 1995 - 1996
Sergey Vakhrukov 1996 - 2000 
Valery Shamin 2000
Andrey Krutikov 2000 - 2008 
Victor Rogotsky 2008 - present

Lists of legislative speakers in Russia
Politics of Yaroslavl Oblast